National Resurrection Party (sometimes translated as Rising Nation Party or National Revival Party) was a centre-right political party in Lithuania.

History
Founded in 2008. The party was headed by a former Lithuanian performer and producer Arūnas Valinskas, who was the Speaker of the Seimas until September 2009.

At the election of 12 October 2008 to the Seimas, the party won 15.09% of the popular vote and 13 seats in the first round.  In the second round, the party won 3 additional seats, taking it up 16 seats in total.  The party until 2012 participated in a new governing coalition, along with Homeland Union – Lithuanian Christian Democrats and the Liberal Movement, which gained a combined governmental majority of 72 out of 141 seats in the Seimas, led by Prime Minister Andrius Kubilius.

Several of its Seimas members left in 2010 to form the Christian Party.  As a result, it formed a joint group in the Seimas with the Liberal and Centre Union, which had also experienced defections. The parties announced their full merger on 22 September 2011. Some members (e. g. Rokas Žilinskas) joined the Homeland Union as well.

References

External links
  Official website

Defunct political parties in Lithuania
Defunct liberal political parties
Liberal parties in Lithuania
Political parties established in 2008
Political parties disestablished in 2011
2008 establishments in Lithuania